Mola del Guerxet is a mountain of Catalonia, Spain. It has an elevation of 1,121 metres above sea level.

See also
Prades Mountains
Mountains of Catalonia

References

Mountains of Catalonia